Stanley Charlton (16 November 1900 – 1971) was an English professional footballer who played as a full back in the Football League for Exeter City, Crystal Palace and Newport County. He was the father of Stan Charlton who also had a career as a professional footballer.

Playing career
Charlton was born on 16 November 1900, in Little Hulton, then within Lancashire, but subsequently part of Greater Manchester.

In May 1928, Charlton was signed for Crystal Palace by Fred Mavin, previously his manager at Exeter City, who immediately made him captain. Palace finished runners-up in Division Three South in 1928–29 missing out on the single promotion place on goal difference. Charlton missed only one game and scored four times. in the following three seasons Charlton made 25 appearances (two goals), 33 appearances (without scoring) and 22 appearances (one goal) respectively. On 8 October 1932, Charlton moved on to Newport County.

Whilst with Exeter City, Charlton toured Australia, in 1925 with an official Football Association XI.

Later career
Stan Charlton died in 1971 aged 70 or 71.

References

External links
Stan Charlton at holmesdale.net

1900 births
1971 deaths
Date of death missing
English footballers
Exeter City F.C. players
Crystal Palace F.C. players
Newport County A.F.C. players
English Football League players
Association football fullbacks
People from Little Hulton